The Ermita de Santa Ana (Chapel of Santa Ana) is located in Chiclana de la Frontera, in the province of Cádiz, Andalusia, southwestern Spain. It is situated on the highest part of the city on the hill of the same name. It was designed by the Cadiz architect Torcuato Cayón de la Vega at the initiative of the brothers Francisco de Paula and José Manjón. After gaining permission from the military as the site was a strategic vantage point, construction occurred between 1772 and 1774. The a porch is a polygon shape with three semicircular holes on pilasters. It is covered with a hemispherical dome with four circular holes to the interior which light the chapel. The entryway opens to the main town of Chiclana and Bay of Cádiz. It has Byzantine, Mozarabic, and Neoclassical features. Inside, it houses a small shrine. A sculpture representing Saint Anne with the Virgin sits within a niche, the work of the Genoese sculptor, Domingo Giscardi, who was based in Cadiz. The chapel is open to the public every Tuesday and July 26, the feast day of Santa Ana.

References

Dionisio Montero Valenzuela, Cerro y Ermita de Santa Ana. Revista El 7º de Chiclana, número 16, Juio-agosto de 2004. (in Spanish)
Monumentos de la provincia de Cádiz, pueblo a pueblo. Patrocinado por Diario de Cádiz, Diario de Jerez y Europa Sur. Año 1984. (in Spanish)

Chapels in Spain
Roman Catholic churches completed in 1774
Churches in Andalusia
Chiclana de la Frontera
18th-century Roman Catholic church buildings in Spain